The following lists events that happened in 1963 in Libya.

Incumbents
Monarch: Idris 
Prime Minister: Muhammad Osman Said (until March 19), Mohieddin Fikini (starting March 19)

Events
1963–64 Libyan Premier League

 
Years of the 20th century in Libya
Libya
Libya
1960s in Libya